Two Rocks is an outer suburb at the northern edge of Perth, the state capital of Western Australia, located  northwest of the city's central business district. It is part of the City of Wanneroo local authority and represents the furthest northern extent of the Perth metropolitan region.

While the suburb has a large area, at the 2001 census the suburb's entire population was recorded living within a  region near the coast surrounding Two Rocks marina. However in more recent years residential development has spread to areas to the east and south-east of the established suburb. Large sections of the suburb are fenced off due to unexploded ordnance left behind from past military activity in the area.

A major landmark in the suburb is a large limestone sculpture of King Neptune by American sculptor Mark Le Buse, a remnant of the defunct Atlantis Marine Park, which operated between 1981 and 1990. The sculpture, which had sat abandoned and fenced off since the park's closure, was heritage listed by the Western Australian Heritage Council in 2006, before being restored and the surrounding area reopened to the public in May 2015. 

In addition to the marina, the suburb also contains a small shopping centre, a public library, and two schools: the private Atlantis Beach Baptist College and the public Two Rocks Primary School.

History 

The suburb of Two Rocks takes its name from two prominent rocks offshore from Wreck Point. It was approved as a suburb name in 1975. 

As well as being the former location of Atlantis Marine Park, the suburb was also a hub of Alan Bond's failed Yanchep Sun City development plan in the 1980s. Sun City was the state's first private residential, commercial and recreational investment project. In recognition of this, the Sun City precinct, which encompasses the marina, shopping centre, the King Neptune sculpture, and the former site of Atlantis Marine Park, was added to the State Register of Heritage Places in January 2023. 

A large bushfire in the area in 1991 destroyed many dwellings in the suburb. Large parts of the suburb were also affected by a major bushfire in December 2019. The fire, which burnt over 14,000 ha over several days, came close to Two Rocks Primary School.

Transport 
Two Rocks is served by the 490 Transperth bus route from Butler railway station, which travels along Marmion Avenue and Yanchep Beach Road. This service is operated by Swan Transit.

References 

Suburbs of Perth, Western Australia
Suburbs of the City of Wanneroo
Marinas in Australia